R. T. Neason is an Indian film director, he earlier worked as assistant director in film like Iraniyan, Prematho Raa, Thavasi, Ondagona Baa and also with Director Bhagyaraj as a screenplay writer. Neason also assisted in story and screenplay of Velayudham.

Personal life
R. T. Neason born in Bodinayakkanur, Tamil Nadu. He did his schooling in Sainik School Amaravathinagar, Tamil Nadu, India. He is married to Lakshmi. They have two Daughters Adithi and Akshara. He completed his Bachelor of Commerce from Madras University, studied in Film and Television Institute of Madras with direction and screenplay specialization.

He worked as assistant director with Vincent Selva and  Udayasankar for films like Iraniyan, Prematho Raa, Thavasi, Ondagona Baa.Film career
Neason started his directorial career with Muruga (film) in 2007, starring Ashok, Shruti Sharma, Samiksha, Vadivelu  and others. The film had music by Karthik Raja released to positive reviews on 7 March 2007 and was an average film.

His second release Jilla features Vijay, Mohanlal, Kajal Aggarwal in the lead roles while Niveda Thomas portraying supporting roles. The film was released on 10 January 2014, coinciding with Pongal and clashing with Ajith Kumar's Veeram. 

Neason has two films to his arsenal as of date and has not worked on any films since Jilla''.

Filmography

References

Living people
Tamil film directors
1972 births
M.G.R. Government Film and Television Training Institute alumni
University of Madras alumni
People from Theni district
Screenwriters from Tamil Nadu
Tamil screenwriters
Film directors from Tamil Nadu
Telugu film directors